Call Center Girl is a 2013 Filipino family comedy drama film directed by Don Cuaresma, starring Pokwang, Jessy Mendiola, and Enchong Dee. The film is produced by Skylight Films and Star Cinema. It premiered on November 27, 2013, as part of Star Cinema's 20th Anniversary presentation.

The film also marks as Pokwang's 11th film under Star Cinema.

Cast

Main Cast

Pokwang as Teresa "Terry" Manlapat
Jessy Mendiola as Regina "Reg" Manlapat
Enchong Dee as Vince Sandoval

Supporting Cast
K Brosas as Lolay
John Lapus as Ritchie
Alex Castro as Martin
Ogie Diaz as Midang
Ejay Falcon as Dennis
Arron Villaflor as Perry Manlapat
Dianne Medina as Claire Manlapat
Dawn Jimenez as Lea

Special Participation
Jestoni Alarcon as Raul Manlapat
Jayson Gainza as Vendor
Pooh as Interviewer
Chokoleit† as Trainer Chokie
Tado Jimenez† as Security Guard
Cheridel Alejandrino as Elevator Girl

References

External links
 

2013 films
2013 comedy-drama films
Star Cinema films
Skylight Films films
2010s Tagalog-language films
Philippine comedy-drama films
2010s English-language films
Films directed by Don Cuaresma